Langford is a  hamlet in the town of North Collins in southern Erie County, New York, United States. The hamlet is located at the junction of NY 249 and NY 75.

Langford's primary attraction is its 4,000-seat stadium, which hosts an annual country music concert and tractor pull in the first weekend of each August.

References

External links
Langford Jamboree and Tractor Pull Grounds

Hamlets in New York (state)
Hamlets in Erie County, New York